Daniel McMillan (born 12 August 1982) is a British handball player. He was born in Broxburn in West Lothian, Scotland. He competed for the British national team at the 2012 Summer Olympics in London.

Career
McMillan played American football before switching to handball after being recruited through the UK Sporting Giants scheme in 2007. He later played for TUSEM Essen along with several other members of the Team GB Handball squad.

References

External links

1982 births
Living people
Sportspeople from Broxburn, West Lothian
British male handball players
Olympic handball players of Great Britain
Handball players at the 2012 Summer Olympics